UWB may refer to:
 Ultra-wideband, a very wide band radio technology
In education:
 University of West Bohemia, Czech Republic
 University of Washington, Bothell, United States
 Bangor University (formerly University of Wales, Bangor), United Kingdom